Risa Kazumi (born 24 April 1978) is a Japanese judoka. She competed in the women's middleweight event at the 1996 Summer Olympics.

References

1978 births
Living people
Japanese female judoka
Olympic judoka of Japan
Judoka at the 1996 Summer Olympics
Sportspeople from Ibaraki Prefecture
Universiade bronze medalists for Japan
Universiade medalists in judo
Medalists at the 1999 Summer Universiade
People from Hitachinaka, Ibaraki
20th-century Japanese women